DZVT (93.7 FM), broadcasting as 93.7 Spirit FM, is a radio station owned and operated by the Apostolic Vicariate of San Jose. The station's studio and transmitter are located in Brgy. Labangan Poblacion, San Jose, Occidental Mindoro.

Last October 26, 2011, the place, which houses DZVT & Spirit FM, was burned by unidentified men.

References

Radio stations established in 2007
Radio stations in Mindoro
Catholic radio stations